Marco Giustiniani (1547–1640) was a Roman Catholic prelate who served as Roman Catholic Bishop of Chios (1604–1640).

Biography
Marco Giustiniani was ordained a priest in the Order of Preachers. On 31 May 1604, he was appointed during the papacy of Pope Gregory XIII as Bishop of Chios. On 12 June 1604, he was consecrated bishop by Girolamo Bernerio, Cardinal-Bishop of Albano, with Agostino Quinzio, Bishop of Korčula, and Vincenzo Giustiniani, Bishop of Gravina di Puglia, serving as co-consecrators. He served as Bishop of Chios until his death in 1640.

References 

17th-century Roman Catholic bishops in the Republic of Venice
Bishops appointed by Pope Gregory XIII
1547 births
1640 deaths
Marco
Ottoman Chios
Roman Catholic bishops of Chios